Club Baloncesto Villarrobledo is a professional basketball club based in Villarrobledo, Castilla-La Mancha, that currently plays in LEB Plata, the third tier of Spanish basketball.

History
Founded on 15 July 1992, CB Villarrobledo started playing its first years in the provincial league of Albacete, until promoting to Tercera Autonómica in 2002. After the dissolution of the league, in 2006 the club joined Segunda Autonómica, Spanish seventh tier and later promoted to Primera Autonómica.

In 2011, Villarrobledo achieves a new promotion, this time to Primera División, and one year later to Liga EBA.

In 2018, the club reaches the LEB Plata by winning the three games of the promotion stage played in Gandía.

Head coaches
José Joaquín Navarro 2006–2008
Vicente Rodríguez 2008–2011
Alfredo Gálvez 2011–2012
Jordi Casas 2012–2013
Boris Balibrea 2013–2015
Manuel Jiménez 2015–

Season by season

Current roster

References

External links
 

Basketball teams in Castilla–La Mancha
Basketball teams established in 1992
Former Liga EBA teams
LEB Plata teams
Villarrobledo